The Federal Reserve Bank of Cleveland Cincinnati Branch Office is one of two Federal Reserve Bank of Cleveland branch offices (the other is in Pittsburgh). The Cincinnati Office of the Federal Reserve Bank of Cleveland provides currency distribution services for financial institutions in multiple Reserve Districts.James M. Anderson is the current chairman.

Current Board of Directors
The following people are on the board of directors as of 2017:

appointed by the Federal Reserve Bank

appointed by the Board of Governors

See also

 Federal Reserve System
 Federal Reserve Districts
 Federal Reserve Bank of Cleveland
 Federal Reserve Bank of Cleveland Pittsburgh Branch Office

References

External links
 Federal Reserve Bank of Cleveland Cincinnati Branch Office
 Cincinnati Board of Directors

Federal Reserve branches